Moses Amweelo (born 25 May 1952 in Okatana, Oshana Region) is a Namibian politician. A member of SWAPO, Amweelo has been a member of the National Assembly since 2000 and the Minister of Works, Transport and Communication.

References

1952 births
Living people
People from Oshana Region
Members of the National Assembly (Namibia)
SWAPO politicians
Government ministers of Namibia